Carmine Sciandra (born July 5, 1952) is accused of being a gangster who serves as a Caporegime in the Gambino crime family and is a co-owner of the Top Tomato grocery chain. In March 2010, Sciandra pleaded guilty to charges of enterprise corruption for running a massive sport-betting and loan sharking ring. He paid $1.2 million in penalties and was sentenced to 1½ to 4½ years in prison. Sciandra served his time at the Hudson Correctional Facility and was released on January 5, 2012.

References

Criminals from New York City
American gangsters of Italian descent
Gambino crime family
Living people
1952 births